Professor Andrekos Varnava, is a dual national Cypriot/Australian writer and historian, who is best known for his work confronting controversial moments in modern history and their consequences.

Life and works
Professor Andrekos Varnava, was born in 1979 in Melbourne to parents of Greek Cypriot descent. He attended schools at South Oakleigh, where he became fascinated by the history of WWI and WWII. History prompted him to identify more with his Cypriot heritage, challenging what it meant to be Cypriot as distinct from being identified as either Greek or Turkish.  Varnava went on to read History, modern Greek and English Literature at Monash University, completing his Honours degree in 2001 and moving on to University of Melbourne, where he completed his PhD (in history) in 2006. Varnava had visited Cyprus briefly a number of times but in 2006, he took up a position as Assistant Professor at the European University Cyprus, a position he held for two years, where he married his wife and when he acquired dual Cypriot nationality in line with his dual heritage (Australian and Cypriot).

In 2009, Varnava returned to Australia to take up a position as lecturer in history at Flinders University, where he remains to this day.  He has written and lectured on British and European history, with special attention paid to both British and Ottoman empires, and their influence on the Middle East.  The interaction of these two empires shaped modern history of Cyprus particularly on nationalism during the late nineteenth century, the First World War and the consequent post-World War II terrorism. Varnava set about publishing his work, writing over 60 papers (articles and book chapters), 4 monographs, 16 edited collections, in the space of 17 years. His main academic focus has been on the history of the British empire, particularly its impact on Cyprus, unpicking the socio-economic effect of such themes as martial races theory and venereal disease, and socio-political themes such as extreme nationalism and chauvinism.   His prolific writing mirrored his academic career at Flinders, where he was promoted senior lecturer in 2012, was invited by Selim Deringil and Vangelis Kechriotis to be a visiting professor at Boğaziçi University in Istanbul in 2012, elected as a Fellow of Royal Historical Society in 2014, promoted to Associate Professor in 2016, made an Honorary Professor at De Montfort University in 2018, and promoted to full Professor in 2022. Varnava has co-authored works with such eminent scholars as Panikos Panayi, Michael J.K. Walsh, Evan Smith, Nicholas Coureas, Marinella Marmo, Hubert Faustmann and Philip Payton, and published in his edited works the work of pre-eminent scholars such as John M. MacKenzie, Eric S. Richards, Joy Damousi, Robert I. Rotberg, Erol Kaymak, and Ayhan Aktar.

Contentious issues
As a PhD candidate at the University of Melbourne in 2003, Varnava appealed to Greek and Turkish Cypriots to set aside their ethnic differences and to reunite their country by accepting that they were both perpetrators and victims of past violence. Whilst in Cyprus, Varnava had become increasingly aware of the cultural isolation of minority groups, which inspired him to organise a conference in 2007, focusing on challenges faced by minorities preserving their identity in a nationalistic state.  In 2009, Varnava asserted that British imperialism in Cyprus was critically flawed, unable to achieve its full purpose in making Cyprus a strategic stronghold for the Empire, creating instead the conditions for Hellenistic sentiments to take hold among the Greek Cypriot population. He followed this with research that blamed British humanitarianism for being selective and restricted by imperialism, particularly in relation to the formation of the French Armenian Legion and Musa Dagh refugees. In 2014 and 2018, Varnava co-organised a conference on WWI at Nanyang Technological University in Singapore, and in his contributions he challenged popular narratives around Greek nationalism and Enosis, which had suppressed the role of Greek and Turkish Cypriots working together in the First World War along with implications of loyalty towards the British.  

In 2016, Varnava openly addressed the systematic killing of Christian Ottoman Greek population of Anatolia in the Greco-Turkish War, which he argued was part of a programme of ethnic cleansing stopping short of actual genocide. He is equally outspoken about Armenian genocide in the Ottoman Empire/Turkey in 1915 and 1916, praising Göçek for calling it out, but criticising her for not making the distinction between genocide, in the case of the Armenians in 1915 and 1916, and ethnic cleansing, which he argues is a more suitable term for what happened after the war during the Franco-Turkish War. 

His latest book published in 2021 describes the assassination of a leading Cypriot politician Antonios Triantafyllides in 1934, attributing his murder to far-right-wing nationalist extremists he connects to the post-war formation of EOKA.  

In 2018, after publishing a seminal article in English Historical Review with Evan Smith on the Cypriots in London during the inter-war years as a 'suspect community', Varnava won as Lead Chief Investigator an Australian Research Council grant to head a team investigating border controls between Britain and Australia in the 20th Century. This was to examine "suspect migrant communities", and how past historical policies compare with contemporary practices, citing British and Australian political, and sometimes racial, influences.

Books and monographs
	British Imperialism and Cyprus 1878-1915: The Inconsequential Possession (Manchester University Press, 2009)
	British imperialism in Cyprus, 1878–1915 – The inconsequential possession (Manchester University Press, 2012)
	Serving the empire in the Great War – The Cypriot Mule Corps, imperial loyalty and silenced memory (Manchester University Press, 2017)
	British Cyprus and the Long Great War, 1914–1925 (Routledge, 2020)
	Assassination in Colonial Cyprus in 1934 and the Origins of EOKA (Anthem Press, 2021)

Selected edited or co-edited volumes
	Reunifying Cyprus: The Annan Plan and Beyond (I. B. Tauris, London, February 2009, paperback 2011), 
	The Minorities of Cyprus: Development Patterns and the Identity of the Internal-Exclusion (Cambridge Scholars Publishing, Newcastle upon Tyne, April 2009)
	The Archbishops of Cyprus in the Modern Age: The Changing Role of the Archbishop-Ethnarch, their Identities and Politics (Cambridge Scholars Publishing, Newcastle upon Tyne, September 2013)
	Imperial Expectations and Realities: El Dorados, Utopias and Dystopias (Manchester University Press, 2015)
	Australia and the Great War: Identity, Memory and Mythology (Melbourne University Press, Melbourne, 2016)
	The Great War and the British Empire: Culture and Society (Routledge Studies in First World War History, 2017)
	Australia, Migration and Empire – Immigrants in a Globalised World (Palgrave Macmillan, London 2019)
	Comic empires- Imperialism in cartoons, caricature, and satirical art (Manchester University Press, 2019)
	After the Armistice – Empire, Endgame and Aftermath (Routledge, 2021)
	Exiting war – The British Empire and the 1918–20 moment (Manchester University Press, 2022)
	New Perspectives on the Greek War of Independence: Myths, Realities, Legacies and Reflections (Palgrave Macmillan/Springer, November 2022)
	Popular Culture and its Relationship to Conflict in the UK and Australia since the Great War (Routledge, 2023)

References and notes

Notes

Living people
1979 births
Cypriot historians
Australian historians
Australian people of Greek Cypriot descent
British Empire in World War I
History of Greece
Writers from Melbourne
21st-century Australian historians
Monash University alumni
University of Melbourne alumni
Academic staff of European University Cyprus
Fellows of the Royal Historical Society
Academics of De Montfort University
Academic staff of Flinders University